Bodroghalász was a village in Borsod-Abaúj-Zemplén County in northeastern Hungary. In 1950 it became part of the town of Sárospatak.

References

Populated places in Borsod-Abaúj-Zemplén County
Former municipalities of Hungary